The National Council of Resistance of Iran (NCRI) is an Iranian political organization based in France and Albania and was founded by Masoud Rajavi and Abolhasan BaniSadr. The organization is a political coalition calling to overthrow the Islamic Republic of Iran. The coalition is made up of different Iranian dissident groups, with its main member being the People's Mujahedin of Iran (MEK). Both organizations are considered to be led by Massoud Rajavi and his wife Maryam Rajavi.

The NCRI is also recognized as the MEK's diplomatic wing opposing the Islamic Republic. In 2002, the NCRI exposed that “Tehran had built nuclear-related facilities.” It was listed as a foreign terrorist organization in 1997, but was removed from this list in 2012 by the U.S. government. The NCRI is considered the largest political opposition to the current Iranian government.

Platform's core concepts
The core concepts of the organization's platform  (to date) include:

Elections based on the principle of universal suffrage;
a pluralistic political system with free assembly, freedom of expression and respect for individual freedoms;
the abolition of the death penalty;
a separation of mosque and state, and prohibitions against religious discrimination;
full gender equality for Iranian women;
a westernization of the Iranian justice system, the elimination of sharia law, and reforms that provide for an array of western legal protections;
adherence to the Universal Declaration of Human Rights and other international instruments that enshrine protections for the population, and a commitment to the equality of all nationalities (in particular autonomy for Iranian Kurdistan);
safeguards for private property, investment and employment, and support for a market economy;
a foreign policy based on the principle of “peaceful coexistence” with other countries;
a rejection of nuclear development and possession of weapons of mass destruction as a whole.

History
President Abolhassan Banisadr was supportive of the MEK and believed the clerics should not govern Iran directly, and was removed from power. Both Massoud Rajavi and Banisdar escaped Iran in 1981 during a campaign by the Iranian government to eradicate the MEK from Iran.

The NCRI was founded by Massoud Rajavi and Abolhassan Banisadr in 1981. Both co-signed a covenant outlining Banisadr “as the Republic’s president”, and of Rajavi “as the chairman both of the National Council and of the republic’s Provisional Government.”  The covenant criticised the Islamic Republic as “dictatorial”, while proposing “a democratic, patriotic, and law-abiding government”. By 1983, the NCRI included the People's Mojahedin of Iran, Kurdistan Democratic Party of Iran (KDPI), National Democratic Front (NDF), the Hoviyat Group, the Union of Iranian Communists, the Workers’ Party, the Union for Workers’ Liberation, the United Left Council for Democracy and Independence, and the Labour Party of Iran.

The Foundation of the NCRI allowed Massoud Rajavi to "assume the position of chairman of the resistance to the Islamic Republic and provided an outlet for the Mojahedin to codify its ideological models for a future government to replace that of the mullahs."

In January 1983, Deputy Prime Minister of Iraq Tariq Aziz and NCRI President Massoud Rajavi signed a peace plan "based on an agreement of mutual recognition of borders as defined by the 1975 Algiers Agreement." According to James Piazza, this peace initiative became the NCRI's first diplomatic act as a "true government in exile. In 1983, elements united with NCRI began to depart the alliance because of conflicts with the MEK. On 24 March 1983, Banisadr officially left the council.

In 1986, the French government closed down NCRI headquarters in Paris to improve relations with the Islamic Republic.

In the Iran–Iraq War the MEK/NCRI formed an alliance with Saddam Hussein, who was largely responsible for its financing, together with Saudi Arabia at that time, though the NCRI also employed fraud to bolster its funding.

In 1993, assassins killed NCRI representative Mohammad Hossein Naqdi in Italy. As a result, the European Parliament issued a condemnation of political murder against the Islamic Republic of Iran.

In 2002 the NCRI exposed nuclear facilities in Natanz and Arak in Iran. Iran was then declared “in breach of the Treaty on the Non-Proliferation of Nuclear Weapons”, which began to limit the nuclear program in Iran.

Christopher Harmon claims that there are a number of organisations set up by the NCRI, including Organization of Iranian American Communities, the Association of Iranian Scholars and Professionals, Association of Iranian Women, California Society for Democracy, Muslim Student Association, National Association of Iranian Academics in Britain, Towhidi Society of Guilds, Movement of Muslim Teachers, and others.

MEK leader Maryam Rajavi is the designated "president-elect" of the organization, i.e. President of Iran for the transitional period. The NCRI has in the past three decades recorded and reported human rights violations in Iran to UN Special Rapporteurs, the UN High Commissioner for Human Rights, Amnesty International and other international human rights organisations.

In 2014, thousands of donations by supporters of the NCRI amounted about one million euros to bootstrap the Spanish far-right party Vox.
The Spanish right-wing politician Alejo Vidal-Quadras had asked his Irani contacts (whom he met during his tenure in the European Parliament) to help him establish the party.

In June 2020, a majority of members of the US House of Representatives backed a “bipartisan resolution” supporting Maryam Rajavi and the NCRI's “call for a secular, democratic Iran” while “condemning Iranian state-sponsored terrorism”. The resolution, backed by 221 lawmakers (including Louie Gohmert and Sheila Jackson Lee), gave support to the Rajavi's 10-point plan for Iran's future (which include “a universal right to vote, market economy, and a non-nuclear Iran”) while calling on the prevention of “malign activities of the Iranian regime’s diplomatic missions.” A NCRI representative said that “The fact that out of ten diplomats or agents of the Iranian regime expelled or jailed in Europe and the U.S. for terror plots over the past two years, eight of them were tied to operations against our movement, is a vivid testimony that the NCRI is the alternative to this regime.” The resolution also called on the U.S. to stand “with the people of Iran who are continuing to hold legitimate and peaceful protests” against the Iranian government.

In February 2021 Belgian court in Antwerp sentenced Assadollah Assadi, who worked at the Iranian embassy in Vienna, to 20-year jail term for plotting to bomb a rally of NCRI outside Paris in June 2018. He was arrested in Germany in June 2018. A Belgian couple of Iranian origin was also arrested with explosives and a detonator. A fourth man, Belgian-Iranian poet Merhad Arefani, was arrested in Paris and accused of being an accomplice. All three were convicted in a Belgian court for taking part in the plot and given jail terms of 15 to 18 years.

Global reception

The NCRI received support from US Congress and US officials including Tom Ridge, Howard Dean, Michael Mukasey, Louis Freeh, Hugh Shelton, Rudy Giuliani, John Bolton, Bill Richardson, James L. Jones, Edward G. Rendell, Brian Binley, and Lt. General Thomas Mclenerney.

The NCRI, along with the MEK is regarded by the governments of the Islamic Republic of Iran and the Republic of Iraq as a terrorist organization, and was classified as a Foreign Terrorist Organisation by the United States, alleging that the NCRI "is not a separate organization, but is instead, and has been, an integral part of the MEK at all relevant times" and that the NCRI is "the political branch" of the MEK. However, it is no longer considered terrorist. On September 28, 2012, the US State Department formally removed MEK from its  list of terrorist organizations in a decision made by then-Secretary of State Hillary Clinton, ahead of an October 1 deadline set by a US appeals court.

Dick Armey (the former House majority leader 1995–2003) suggested that the State Department wrongly included MEK in the terrorist list from the beginning. Alireza Jafarzadeh was its official representative in the US until the Washington office was closed by the US State Department in 2002 on the grounds that it was only a front group for the MEK by then listed as a terrorist organisation in the US. It has been alleged that the inclusion of NCRI and MEK in the list was a token offered to the Iranian government rather than based on the facts of the matter. According to the Wall Street Journal "Senior diplomats in the Clinton administration say the MEK figured prominently as a bargaining chip in a bridge-building effort with Tehran." The Journal added that: In 1997, the State Department added the MEK to a list of global terrorist organizations as "a signal" of the US's desire for rapprochement with Tehran's reformists, said Martin Indyk, who at the time was assistant secretary of state for Near East Affairs. President Khatami's government "considered it a pretty big deal," Indyk said.

The European Union in May 2004 implied that NCRI is part of the People's Mujahedin of Iran and excluded the NCRI itself from a list of organisations considered to be terrorist organisations, including the People's Mujahedin of Iran "minus the National Council of Resistance of Iran" on its list of terrorist organisations.
On January 26, 2009, EU Council of Ministers agreed to remove the MEK from the EU terror list. The group said it was the outcome of a "seven-year-long legal and political battle". The European Union had previously listed the MEK on its list but excluded the NCRI itself from the list of organizations considered to be terrorist organizations. According to some sources, it has an active global network, and engages in propaganda and lobbying in many Western capitals.

The Middle East department of the Foreign and Commonwealth Office (FCO) in the United Kingdom stated in early 2006 that it is widely understood that "Iran's [nuclear] program, which was kept secret from the IAEA for 18 years, became public knowledge largely because of revelations of the NCRI, and this led to heightened international concern." At the same time Michael Axworthy, former head of the Iran section at the FCO, claimed that the NCRI is a "tightly disciplined front organization for the MEK" and deemed them unreliable.

In a meeting at the Council of Europe in April 2006, Maryam Rajavi, President-elect of the NCRI, elaborated on the movement's vision for a future Iran and presented a Ten Point Plan for Future Iran, according to the organisation's website. The plan has been supported by British MPs, some arguing that it is a potential programme that "would transform Iran" since it calls for the abolition of the death penalty, the creation of a modern legal system and the independence of judges. At a debate on the human rights situation in Iran in the House of Lords on December 8, 2016, Lord Alton of Liverpool said, "The manifesto says: Cruel and degrading punishments will have no place in the future Iran. Madam Rajavi would end Tehran's funding of Hamas, Hezbollah and other militant groups and is committed to peaceful coexistence, relations with all countries and respect for the United Nations charter."

According to a RAND report, the NCRI was transformed from an umbrella organization into a MEK subsidiary. The NCRI says it fights for the establishment of a democratic and secular republic in Iran, on a platform espousing such political values as secular government, democratic elections, freedom of expression, equal rights for women and human rights. Also according to the RAND report, the NCRI has hidden the Marxist-Islamic elements, and practices gender segregation.

References

External links

 NCRI's official website

 
Governments in exile
Political party alliances in Iran
People's Mojahedin Organization of Iran
Organizations formerly designated as terrorist by the United States
1981 establishments in France
Organisations designated as terrorist by Iran
Banned political parties in Iran
Political organizations based in France
Iran–United States relations
France–Iran relations